Southern Nilandhe Atoll, Nilande Atoll South or Dhaalu is one of the atolls of the Maldives.  It corresponds to the natural atoll of the same name.
Out of a total of 56 islands, eight of the islands are inhabited, with a total population of around 6694.
The capital island is Kudahuvadhoo, located at the atoll's southern tip.

Hulhudheli and Rinbudhoo (Rimbudu) islands, located to the west of this atoll, are islands traditionally renowned for the skill of their jewellers.

Opened to tourism in 1998, the atoll has become a popular location for SCUBA diving. 

Some of the islands in this atoll have remains from the Buddhist period, but none of them have been properly excavated yet.

References
 Divehi Tārīkhah Au Alikameh. Divehi Bahāi Tārikhah Khidmaiykurā Qaumī Markazu. Reprint 1958 edn. Malé 1990.
 Divehiraajjege Jōgrafīge Vanavaru. Muhammadu Ibrahim Lutfee. G.Sōsanī.
 Xavier Romero-Frias, The Maldive Islanders, A Study of the Popular Culture of an Ancient Ocean Kingdom. Barcelona 1999.

References
Divehi Tārīkhah Au Alikameh. Divehi Bahāi Tārikhah Khidmaiykurā Qaumī Markazu. Reprint 1958 edn. Malé 1990.
Divehiraajjege Jōgrafīge Vanavaru. Muhammadu Ibrahim Lutfee. G.Sōsanī.

Atolls of the Maldives

dv:ނިލަންދެއަތޮޅު ދެކުނުބުރި